Dean Paulo Villegas Hubalde (born January 24, 1981) is a Filipino professional basketball player for the Quezon City Beacons of the Pilipinas Super League. He is the son of one of the greatest shooters to ever play in the PBA, Freddie Hubalde. Paulo plays the guard position.

College career
Hubalde played college basketball for the University of the East (UE) Red Warriors, playing alongside Paul Artadi, James Yap, Niño Canaleta, and Ronald Tubid.

Professional career
Hubalde was drafted by the San Miguel Beermen in the 2005 PBA draft. He was San Miguel's lone draftee in 2005, drafting Hubalde with the intention of being a understudy for the aging Olsen Racela. His role diminished when the Beermen took in Brandon Cablay and played only eight games in that season in just five minutes a night of exposure.

Hubalde saw himself reuniting with coach Jong Uichico with the Barangay Ginebra Kings in a multi-player trade in the early part of the season. However, he was a third stringer in the point guard rotation after the Kings signed veteran Johnny Abarrientos to be the chief backup of Jayjay Helterbrand.

During the 2008–09 season, Hubalde was signed by the Barako Bull Energy Boosters, where he finally had the chance to prove his skills as an athletic point guard.

After the 2010–11 PBA Philippine Cup, he was acquired by the Beermen for a second stint. There he became a role player and helped the Cojuangco-owned franchise now known as the Petron Blaze Boosters win the 2011 PBA Governors' Cup against Talk 'N Text.

This off-season, he and Magi Sison were involved in a three-team, seven player deal that sent Nonoy Baclao and Robert Reyes to Air21.

On November 12, 2014 Hubalde was traded by the San Miguel Beermen to Barako Bull Energy in exchange for Jeric Fortuna.

References

1981 births
Living people
Air21 Express players
Barako Bull Energy players
Barako Bull Energy Boosters players
Barangay Ginebra San Miguel players
Filipino men's basketball players
NorthPort Batang Pier players
Terrafirma Dyip players
UE Red Warriors basketball players
Point guards
San Miguel Beermen players
Shooting guards
Basketball players from Quezon City
San Miguel Alab Pilipinas players
Maharlika Pilipinas Basketball League players
San Miguel Beermen draft picks
Filipino expatriate basketball people in Thailand